Fairfield Stags basketball may refer to either of the basketball teams that represent Fairfield University:

Fairfield Stags men's basketball
Fairfield Stags women's basketball